Bedingfield is a town in Suffolk, England.

Bedingfield may also refer to:

Bedingfield (surname)
Bedingfield, Georgia, town in Georgia, U.S.

See also
Bedingfeld, a surname